Graecoanatolica lacustristurca is a species of freshwater snail, an aquatic gastropod mollusk in the family Hydrobiidae. The species is endemic to Lake Beyşehir and Lake Eğirdir in Turkey.

References

Hydrobiidae
Graecoanatolica
Gastropods described in 1973
Endemic fauna of Turkey